A phonofiddle is a class of stringed musical instruments that are played with a bow and use a phonograph type reproducer as a voice-box.

The sound producing diaphragm may be a metal cone as in the Stroh violin or a mica sheet as in the instruments made by A. T. Howson, London and the Stroviols company of Britain. The sound generated by the vibrations from the string or strings are transferred through the bridge to a connecting arm into the center of the diaphragm within the reproducer. The vibrating column of air is then directed into one or several horns.

On 4 May 1899, Johannes Matthias Augustus Stroh applied for a patent in Great Britain, GB9418 titled Improvements in Violins and other Stringed Instruments which was accepted on 24 March 1900. This described the use of a flat metal (other materials are also mentioned) diaphragm in the voice-box (reproducer) of a violin to mechanically amplify the sound.

Then on 16 February 1901 he applied for a second Great British patent, GB3393 titled . Which was accepted on 14 December 1901. This effectively extended the first concept to now use a conical resonator with corrugations at its edge, allowing a more 'rigid' diaphragm. His failure to register his inventions in the USA allowed John Dopyera and Geo Beauchamp to subsequently obtain US patents for the tricone and single cone designs used in National brand instruments.

The use of a phonograph reproducer with mica Isinglass diaphragms allowed the cost of production to be reduced.

Phonofiddles had a brief period of popularity as studio instruments for acoustic recording of phonograph records as the energy of the sound could be directed into the collection horn of the recording equipment. Later the phonofiddle was relegated to novelty performances such as those of The Temperance Seven and Bennett & Williams.

See also
 Stroh violin

String instruments